Gazabad-e Yek (also Romanized as Gazābād-e Yek; also known as Gazābād) is a village in Jazmurian Rural District, Jazmurian District, Rudbar-e Jonubi County, Kerman Province, Iran. At the 2006 census, its population was 62, in 15 families.

References 

Populated places in Rudbar-e Jonubi County